Atom Asset Exchange (AAX) is a defunct cryptocurrency exchange that offered spot, perpetual contracts and savings products across a wide variety of digital assets, including Bitcoin, Ethereum and others.

History 
AAX was formed in 2018, in Seychelles, operating primarily in Hong Kong. CEO Thor Chan has resigned since May, 2021.

Two days after crypto exchange FTX filed for bankruptcy, AAX suspended all withdrawals on the 13th of November 2022, and deleted its social media accounts. On December 16th, its website and App ceased to function. Using the Telegram app, thousands of AAX investors formed multiple online messaging groups, joining their efforts to locate the senior executives of the company. On December 23rd, 2022, two men were detained by police in Hong Kong.

Products 
AAX offered crypto futures contracts, spot pairs, P2P fiat trading, savings products, and API connectivity. AAX supports bitcoin trading along with support for over 20 fiat currencies.

References

External links 

 

Digital currency exchanges
Corporate scandals
Cryptocurrency scams